Microchrysa flavicornis, the green gem, is a European species of soldier fly.

Description
A small species (Body 4.5 to 5.0 mm. long) Antennae red-yellow, third antennomere brown, arista black. Legs predominantly yellow, femora III blackish. Pubescence in middle part of mesonotum and on abdomen light-colored in male. Abdomen of female and also frons of female metallic green. Halteres yellow. Wings hyaline. Abdomen with golden reflections.

Biology
The flight period is June to August. Habitats are deciduous woodland edges, hedgerows, isolated trees and bushes. Larvae have been found in dung.

Distribution
North Europe. Central Europe.

References

Stratiomyidae
Diptera of Europe
Insects described in 1822
Taxa named by Johann Wilhelm Meigen